= Southside Shores, Virginia =

Unincorporated community in Virginia, United States

Coordinates: 36°33′05″N 77°51′15″W

Southside Shores is an unincorporated community located in Brunswick County, in the U.S. state of Virginia.
